The foreign policy of Justin Trudeau is Canada's foreign policy since Justin Trudeau became Prime Minister in November 2015. Mélanie Joly has served as the Minister of Foreign Affairs since October 2021.

Trudeau's premiership has been marked with continued close relations with the United States. He has served opposite three U.S. Presidents: Barack Obama, Donald Trump, and Joe Biden. Though the relationship was strained at times under the Trump presidency, Canada remained a close ally of the United States under his government. He signed the Canada–United States–Mexico Agreement (CUSMA), and took a leadership role in the Lima Group: an organisation dedicated to supporting the US-aligned opposition in Venezuela. Canada also continued advancing its relationships with the European Union and Asia-Pacific countries with the signing of Comprehensive Economic and Trade Agreement (CETA), and the Comprehensive and Progressive Agreement for Trans-Pacific Partnership (CPTPP) respectively.

Canada's relationship with China deteriorated, especially following the 2018 arrest of Meng Wanzhou. Following Meng's arrest at the Vancouver airport in December 2018, two Canadians (Michael Spavor and Michael Kovrig) were taken in custody. The three of them were held for over 1000 days before being released simultaneously on September 24, 2021. The episode was symptomatic of a major decline in relations between the two countries. Likewise Canada has also seen tense relations with Saudi Arabia following Canada's call for human rights activist Raif Badawi's release, to which Saudi Arabia responded by suspending diplomatic relations.

General aspects 
In a March 2016 speech at the University of Ottawa, Stéphane Dion, Trudeau's first foreign affairs minister, used "responsible conviction" – a term syncretized from the work of German sociologist Max Weber – to describe the Trudeau government's foreign policy. Dion sought re-engagement with the world, including authoritarian regimes such as Russia and Iran and a focus on multilateralism, climate change, and the United Nations. Dion indicated that Canada would oppose capital punishment for Canadians imprisoned abroad and would change its contribution to the fight against the Islamic State of Iraq and the Levant from providing airstrikes to providing special forces trainers. Dion also tied the concept of responsible conviction to continuing some policies of the previous Stephen Harper government in a modified manner, such as continuing its maternal and newborn health initiative but with new funding for abortion and family planning. He also justified continuing a $15 billion sale of light armored vehicles to Saudi Arabia despite its human rights abuses to protect Canadian jobs and preserve Canada's credibility in signing major international deals, but committed to reassessing the rules on Canadian export permits so that future deals would conform to Canadian interests such as human rights promotion. Dion ended his speech by rejecting the concept of Canada as an honest broker, because that term had become too associated with moral relativism and lack of conviction, instead saying that Canada had to be "a fair-minded and determined peace builder."

In its July 25, 2019 Special Report of Canada's international role during the premiership of Prime Minister Trudeau, The Economist, said that despite "politics" that muddied Canada's relationship with several foreign powers, Canada's "place internationally was still strong" with friendly relations with "Europe, Australasia and beyond".

Personnel 

Trudeau's first Minister of Foreign Affairs was former Liberal leader Stéphane Dion. On 10 January 2017, Dion was replaced as Minister of Foreign Affairs by Chrystia Freeland in a cabinet shuffle, with the move being seen in part as a response to the incoming Trump administration. Dion subsequently resigned his post as MP and was appointed Canadian Ambassador to Germany. In 2019, Foreign Policy named Freeland "Diplomat of the Year" as a "key defender" of this system and for "speaking out for fair trade policies and against human rights violations." Following the 2019 Canadian federal election, François-Philippe Champagne became Foreign Minister as Freeland took the position of Minister of Finance and Deputy prime minister, thereby retaining her influence of Canadian foreign policy.  On 12 January 2021, Champagne was replaced as Minister of Foreign Affairs by Marc Garneau in a cabinet shuffle, with the move being seen in part as a response to the incoming Biden administration. Following the 2021 Canadian federal election, Mélanie Joly became Foreign Minister.

International treaties 
In 2016, the Trudeau government promised to sign the Optional Protocol to the Convention against Torture but never did. The Trudeau government signed the Arms Trade Treaty in 2019, The government also signed
the Declaration on the Rights of Indigenous Peoples in 2021.

Syrian civil war 

In October 2015, Trudeau stated that, once prime minister, he would end Canada's Operation Impact airstrike mission against ISIL. In his mandate letter to Defence Minister Harjit Sajjan, he also called for increased focus on Canadian trainers for local troops and humanitarian aid for the region.

In November 2015, Trudeau was asked whether his plans to change Canada's contribution to the fight against ISIL and to repeal parts of Bill C-51 would change following the terrorist attacks in Paris. Trudeau responded, "It's too soon to jump to conclusions, but obviously governments have a responsibility to keep their citizens safe, while defending our rights and freedoms, and that balance is something the Canadian government, and indeed all governments around the world, will be focusing on."

In June 2016, Trudeau's Liberals voted against a Conservative motion in Parliament to recognize ISIL's atrocities as genocide; during a question period, Trudeau said that Canada "strongly condemns the atrocities committed by" ISIL but voted against the resolution because "We do not feel that politicians should be weighing in on this first and foremost. Determinations of genocide need to be made in an objective, responsible way. That is exactly what we have formally requested the international authorities weigh in on." Following the issuance of a report by a United Nations inquiry formally concluding that ISIL was perpetrating a genocide of Yazidis, Trudeau's government recognized the genocide.

In October 2019, Canada condemned the unilateral Turkish invasion of the Kurdish areas in Syria.

Refugees 

In 2017, Trudeau criticized U.S. President Donald Trump's issuance of an executive order banning refugees from seven countries, six of which have Muslim majorities, from entering the United States. On social media, Trudeau displayed support for affected refugees.

Since Trudeau was elected as Prime Minister, over 25,000 Syrian refugees have settled in Canada.

UN Security Council bid 

In June 2020, Canada lost a vote on temporary membership of the United Nations Security Council. Trudeau was criticized for having an unclear message on the world stage. Meanwhile, opposition leader Andrew Scheer criticized the campaign as "another foreign affairs failure for Justin Trudeau," accusing him of "[selling] out Canada's principles for a personal vanity project. Former U.N. ambassador under Prime Minister Brian Mulroney, Stephen Lewis, pointed to public controversies affecting the Trudeau "brand" as having played a role in the results, such as the prime minister's much-talked-about trip to India in 2018 and photos of the prime minister in blackface that were revealed during the 2019 federal election campaign. However, Bessma Momani, an international affairs expert at the University of Waterloo, said it is not fair to see the loss as an indictment of Trudeau's global popularity. Chris Westdal, a former Canadian diplomat who had headed missions in Moscow and Geneva, also dismissed criticisms of Trudeau's image as having an effect on Canada's standing internationally, writing in an op-ed for the Ottawa Citizen that "Though his critics wouldn't have you believe it, our prime minister is known and respected in the world for more than colourful socks and zany costumes."

Other observers and commentators, including Adam Chapnick, author of Canada on the United Nations Security Council: A Small Power on a Large Stage, and Thomas Juneau, Associate Professor at the University of Ottawa Graduate School of Public and International Affairs, did not even mention Trudeau's personal "brand" as a factor in their respective analyses, but have highlighted more complex factors they felt were more likely to have affected the outcome of the bid, and Canada's international outlook more generally. Among these were the late start to Canada's campaign (roughly a decade after competitors Ireland and Norway); a structural decline in Canadian foreign policy that predated and continued into Trudeau's premiership, including Trudeau's government requiring considerable time and resources to deal with Donald Trump's administration and rivalries with such countries as China, India, and Saudi Arabia; internal friction between the prime minister and former Liberal Party leader turned German ambassador Stéphane Dion; and even flaws within the selection process and the UNSC apparatus itself, including the veto power of its permanent membership leading to a "perpetual stalemate" and the ultra-competitiveness of Canada being clustered with European countries, which tend to vote as a bloc, an element of the campaign that Trudeau had also found fault with. In a press conference on 17 June 2020, the day the vote was to be held, Trudeau stated, "I have nothing but respect for our two competitors, Ireland and Norway, that have demonstrated an engagement in the world. It is unfortunate that we’re in a situation of having to compete against friends for this."

Following the results, at a press conference the following day, Trudeau went on to cite Canada's late start to the campaign as a significant factor in the outcome. He then declared that Canada would nevertheless have a strong global voice due to the deepened relations it had forged with other countries, and that it would "continue to work with [allies] on all our shared values on the world stage."

International trade 

Under Justin Trudeau, Canada entered two new major free trade agreements. These are the Comprehensive Economic and Trade Agreement (CETA), between Canada and the European Union—negotiated by then Minister of International Trade, Chrystia Freeland, —the "biggest trade deal since NAFTA"— and the Comprehensive and Progressive Agreement for Trans-Pacific Partnership with ten Pacific countries. The Economist argues that the foreign relations with the United States and China were "more resilient" than the media reports "imply".

 Nuclear weapons 

Justin Trudeau's government decided not to sign the UN Treaty on the Prohibition of Nuclear Weapons, a binding agreement for negotiations for the total elimination of nuclear weapons, supported by more than 120 nations.

 Cuba 

After the passing of Cuba's former president Fidel Castro in November 2016, Trudeau released a statement that described him as a "remarkable leader" and a "larger than life leader who served his people". United States Republican Senator Marco Rubio called the statement "shameful and embarrassing", while Canadian MP Maxime Bernier called his remarks "repugnant". Trudeau's father Pierre was Fidel Castro's friend. Pierre expanded trade with Cuba, offered the country humanitarian aid, and was the first NATO leader to make an official state visit to Cuba.

 China 

When Trudeau entered office in 2015, Canada had a good relationship with China, and the new Prime minister tried to strengthen Canada's ties with the middle kingdom. In 2016, Trudeau visited China and attended the G-20 summit in Hangzhou where he was affectionately nicknamed Xiao Tudou, meaning "little potato" by the Chinese public. Trudeau visited China again in December 2017 to launch trade negotiations. However, relations between the two countries became tense again on the onset China–United States trade war. The turmoil lead to the Arrest of Meng Wanzhou at the Vancouver International Airport in December 2018 at the behest of the United States, and the arrest of Michael Spavor and Michael Kovrig in China 12 days later. As these three individuals were released at the exact same time in September 2021, many observers speculated they were exchanged as part of a deal between the United States and China.

During Justin Trudeau's second term in office, Canada voiced support for the 2019–2020 Hong Kong protests, and called for a U.N investigation into the Uyghur genocide. Meanwhile, China called for an U.N. investigation into the treatment of the indigenous peoples in Canada in the Canadian Indian residential school system, and into human rights abuses against migrants in Canadian detention centers.

 India 

Trudeau drew criticism for his trip to India in February 2018, as the official schedule had few business meetings while having numerous photo ops at tourist stops. The BBC  wrote that Trudeau was "jet-setting around the country to take part in what appears to be a series of photo ops cunningly designed to showcase his family's elaborate traditional wardrobe". In addition, Liberal MP Randeep Sarai originally invited convicted attempted murder Jaspal Atwal to an event (Atwal posed with Sophie Gregoire Trudeau at an event in India), although the invite was later rescinded. The Atwal invite controversy also led to fears from Indian prime minister Narendra Modi that Trudeau was appealing to Sikh fundamentalists.

On December 1, 2020, Trudeau expressed concerns about the Indian government's handling of farmer protests. Trudeau stated that "Canada will always there to defend the right of peaceful protestors" and expressed support for "the process of dialogue." Following his remarks, the Government of India summoned Canada's High Commissioner to India, Nadir Patel, to register its protest against Trudeau's comments.

Israeli-Palestinian Conflict

Trudeau's policy regarding the Israeli–Palestinian conflict was initially a continuation of his predecessor's unwavering support for the state of Israel. In 2015, Trudeau's House of Commons voted for a resolution to condemn the Boycott, Divestment and Sanctions movement. Canada also voted against all resolutions to condemn Israel's violations of Palestinian rights at the United Nations until 2019, when it started to vote for them.

Canada welcomed Trump's peace agreement between Israel and the United Arab Emirates as a positive and historic step towards a peaceful and secure Middle East, adding Canada was gladdened by suspension of Israel's plans to annex parts of the Palestinian territories in the West Bank.

 Myanmar 
Foreign affairs minister Freeland condemned the persecution of Rohingya Muslims in Myanmar. She said the violence against the Rohingya "looks a lot like ethnic cleansing and that is not acceptable." Canada subsequently stripped Myanmar leader Aung San Suu Kyi of her honorary Canadian citizenship.

Following the 2021 Myanmar coup d'état, the Government of Canada condemned the violence perpetrated by the Tatmadaw against journalists and civilians protesting the coup. Canada's official declaration on the issue expresses "support the people of Myanmar in their quest for democracy, freedom, peace and prosperity".

 Philippines 

Justin Trudeau was Prime Minister during the most tense period of the Canada–Philippines waste dispute, an international row over mislabeled Canadian garbage shipped to Manila by a recycling company. The dispute started when 103 shipping containers left Vancouver in 2013–14 with what was labeled as recyclable plastics; but they instead contained household waste. Trudeau initially tried to convince the Philippines to dispose of the waste themselves, without success. In November 2017, Trudeau promised to solve the issue, but he did nothing until April 2019, when Philippine President Rodrigo Duterte sent an ultimatum to Canada to bring their trash home. On May 30, 2019, 69 containers of Canadian trash began their trip home.

 Saudi Arabia 

One of Justin Trudeau 'first foreign policy statements included a call to diffuse Sunni-Shiite tensions in the aftermath of Nimr al-Nimr's execution in Saudi Arabia.

After taking office, Trudeau was urged by Human Rights groups to stop the $15 billion arms deal with Saudi Arabia – believed to be the largest arms sale in Canadian history. Human rights and arms control groups have repeatedly called upon Trudeau to halt the deal in light of Saudi Arabia's poor human rights record and the humanitarian crisis associated with the Saudi Arabian-led intervention in Yemen. Trudeau said he would abide by the deal negotiated by the previous administration as "a matter of principle", and that "It's important that people know that when they sign a deal with Canada, a change of government isn't going to lead to the contract being ripped up." In 2016, Trudeau's government approved export permits for the shipment of most of Canadian-made LAV III combat vehicles to Saudi Arabia under the deal, which is valued at $11.3 billion

In August 2018, Canada called for the immediate release of Saudi blogger Raif Badawi and his sister Samar. In response to Canada's criticism, Saudi Arabia expelled Canada's ambassador, and froze trade with Canada. Trudeau said that Canada will "continue to speak clearly and firmly on issues of human rights at home and abroad wherever we see the need".

In October 2018, Trudeau condemned the killing of Saudi dissident journalist Jamal Khashoggi at the Saudi consulate in Istanbul, promised "consequences"; later that month, following Khashoggi's killing and the continuation of the war in Yemen, Trudeau announced that his government was suspending the issuance of new arms export permits to Saudi Arabia pending a review. Despite this moratorium, Canada doubled its weapons sales to Saudi Arabia to $3.3 billion Canadian dollars in 2019.

In January 2019, at the request of the Office of the United Nations High Commissioner for Refugees, Canada granted asylum to 18-year-old Saudi teenager Rahaf Mohammed, who was fleeing her abusive family in Kuwait; Freeland personally greeted Mohammed at Toronto Pearson International Airport.

 United States 

Trudeau enjoyed good relations with the like-minded United States President Barack Obama, despite Trudeau's support for the Keystone Pipeline which was rejected by the Democratic President.

Following Donald Trump's inauguration in January 2017, Canada-US relations deteriorated. The Trumps administration forced the renegotiation of NAFTA to create the CUSMA, in which Canada made significant concessions in allowing increased imports of American milk, weakening Canada's dairy supply management system. Donald Trump also implemented Tariffs on Canadian steel and aluminium, to which Trudeau retaliated by imposing Tariffs on American steel, aluminium and a variety of other American products.

Following Joe Biden's inauguration in January 2021, Trudeau stated that he was "much more aligned" with the new President "on values, on focus, on the work that needs to be done to give opportunities for everyone while we build a better future".  However, Trudeau expressed his concerns over the swift foreign policy changes of the new administration, namely the cancellation of the Keystone pipeline expansion and Biden's "Buy America" executive order.

 Venezuela 

Following the 2018 Venezuelan presidential election, Canada condemned Venezuelan president Nicolás Maduro, who had "seized power through fraudulent and anti-democratic elections." On January 23, Canada immediately recognized National Assembly President Juan Guaidó as the Interim president of Venezuela.

Canada then took a leading role in the Lima Group, a multi-lateral organization committed to opposing Venezuela's government. Canada held a Lima Group Summit in Ottawa and on February 4, 2019, Canada's Federal Government pledged 53 million dollars of aid to Venezuela. In June 2019, the Canadian government closed its resident embassy in Caracas as a result of diplomatic visas unable to be renewed under President Maduro's government. Despite these developments, Maduro remains in power in Venezuela as of 2022.

 Yemen 
In 2021, the Minister of International Development pledged a $69.9 million worth of humanitarian aid to Yemen.

 References 

Further reading
 Broadhead, Lee-Anne, and Sean Howard. "The Nuclear Ban Treaty and the cloud over Trudeau’s ‘feminist’ foreign policy." International Journal 74.3 (2019): 422-444.
 Cantin, Marc-Olivier. "A Year Under Trudeau: The Fundamental Shifts in Canadian Foreign Policy." Global Policy Journal 16 (2016). online
 Congressional Research Service. Canada-U.S. Relations (Congressional Research Service, 2021) 2021 Report, by an agency of the U.S. government; not copyright; Updated February 10, 2021.
 Coulon, Jocelyn. Canada is Not Back: How Justin Trudeau is in over his head on foreign policy (James Lorimer & Company, 2019).
 Gecelovsky, Paul. "A  'Handyman’s' Approach: Erin O’Toole and Canadian Foreign Policy." in Political Turmoil in a Tumultuous World (Palgrave Macmillan, Cham, 2021) pp. 147–164; covers policy of Conservative opposition
 Hillmer, Norman, and Philippe Lagassé, eds. Justin Trudeau and Canadian foreign policy (Springer, 2018).
 Komarov, Andrey Nikolaevich. "The domestic and foreign policy of the Canadian Liberals under Justin Trudeau in 2015-2020: achievements and challenges." RUDN Journal of World History 13.2 (2021): 230-237. DOI: https://doi.org/10.22363/2312-8127-2021-13-2-230-237
 Lajeunesse, Adam, and P. Whitney Lackenbauer. "Defence Policy in the Canadian Arctic: From Jean Chrétien to Justin Trudeau." in Canadian Defence Policy in Theory and Practice. (Palgrave Macmillan, Cham, 2020) pp. 365–382.
 Lim, Preston. "Sino-Canadian relations in the age of Justin Trudeau." Canadian Foreign Policy Journal 26.1 (2020): 25-40.
 Marland, Alex. "The brand image of Canadian Prime Minister Justin Trudeau in international context." Canadian Foreign Policy Journal 24.2 (2018): 139-144. online
 Meyer, Paul. "A foreign policy review for Canada–is Global Britain a model to emulate?." Canadian Foreign Policy Journal (2021): 1-6.
 Robertson, Colin. "‘Canada is Back’: Justin Trudeau’s Foreign Policy." Policy Magazine (2017): 7-9. online
 Tiessen, Rebecca, and Heather A. Smith. "Canada’s ‘Feminist’ Foreign Policy Under the Harper Conservatives (2006–2015) and Trudeau Liberals (2015–2019) in Global Perspective." in The Palgrave Handbook of Canada in International Affairs'' (Palgrave Macmillan, Cham, 2021) pp. 117–139.

Justin Trudeau
Foreign policy by government
Canadian foreign policy